István Wampetits, also spelled as István Vampetich (1903–1993) was a Hungarian-Swedish football player and coach.

Wampetits coached Debreceni VSC, Degerfors IF, Malmö FF, Kalmar FF, AIK, Halmstads BK, Örgryte IS and HIFK.

References

1903 births
1993 deaths
Association football midfielders
Hungarian footballers
Hungarian football managers
Hungarian expatriate football managers
Swedish footballers
Swedish football managers
Swedish expatriate football managers
Debreceni VSC managers
Degerfors IF managers
Malmö FF managers
AIK Fotboll managers
Örgryte IS managers
Kalmar FF managers
Halmstads BK managers
Hungarian emigrants to Sweden
Expatriate football managers in Sweden
HIFK Fotboll managers